Louis Aimé Victor Becq de Fouquières (17 December 1831 – 22 October 1887) was a versatile French man of letters from Paris.

Biography
His family came from the Pas-de-Calais. He gave up a military career and became known for his critical editions on the work of André Chénier. He also published selected French Renaissance poetry by Pierre de Ronsard, François de Malherbe, Jean Antoine de Baïf and Joachim du Bellay. He also wrote on Aspasia of Miletus, French versification, and theatre, and was an early historian of ancient board games.

External links 
 
 

1831 births
1887 deaths
Writers from Paris
French didactic writers
French literary critics
19th-century French poets
French male poets
19th-century French male writers
French male non-fiction writers